Kaniyamkunnu is a historical place in Kerala, India.

Location
Kaniyamkunnu is located between Alwaye and Parur.

This place situated exact center of the East Kadungaloor and Union Christian College Aluva.

History
The place known as "Kaniyan" Kunnu, in olden days some families from the community - Kaniyan, who were used this hill for the shelter. Now, the new Vallarpadam Terminal road marked through this place. Earlier, Binani zink developed road through this place for smoothening their transporting. 
Vellamkunnu Bhagavathi Temple is the centre of the hill. some group of families formed this temple.

Schools
Union Christian College, Settlement High School, Fisheries College, Kadungaloor etc.

Transportation
From the place Alwaye anyone can access this place by bus. nearest KSRTC bus point is Union Christian college Jn or private bus point is East Kadungalloor Jn. From this two bus point Minimum charge for Auto of Half KM to walk to Kaniyamkunnu. Nearest Railway station is Alwaye or Angamali. Airport is Nedumbaserry. Now Vallarpadam terminal road connected to Binani Road, So travel is very easy to access NH17 and NH47 through this road.

Local Clubs
Some Group of Residents association are formed nearby, are Themalil Residents Association (TRA), Bhuwaneswari Residents Association, Our residents Association etc. Kadungalloor Service Society, Bank of india are some financial banks nearby

Kaniyankunnu Friends Association (KFA), Bhagath Singh Youth Club (BYC), Bhagathsingh Charity Forum, Mazhavillu, Charivuparambil Residence Association etc are the Residence associations formed around Kaniyankunnu.

Kaniyankunnu Friends Association (KFA) and Bhagath Singh Youth Club (BYC)  were conducting Free Sambharam mela in all sivarathri days at aluva manapuram since 2002

References

Villages in Ernakulam district